Esmeralda Mitre (born May 14, 1982, Buenos Aires) is an Argentine actress and businesswoman. She's a descendant of ex-president, and founder of the La Nación newspaper, Bartolomé Mitre.

Biography 
Esmeralda Mitre was born in Buenos Aires, Argentina, in 1982. She's the daughter of ex-model and plastic artist Blanca Isabel Álvarez de Toledo and Bartolomé Luis Mitre. She began her acting career when she was almost 20.

Her first plays were in unitarios and soap operas, then she veered to theatre and film. In 2008 she starred in Ariel Broitman's La vida anterior, with Elena Roger. In July 2010 she interpreted Ofelia in Hamlet under the helm of Juan Carlos Gené in the Teatro Presidente Alvear theatre. In 2014 she worked in Marcos Carnevale's play, Adictas a vos, and in television she was in Taxxi, on Telefé, and Guapas on Canal 13 where she interpreted Dolores Hasting. Her husband was appointed director of Teatro Colón, his appointment drew criticism as they questioned the appointment of a political figure without any credentials for the job, also they questioned his access to the job after his marriage with Esmeralda Mitre, attributing that designation to the marriage.

Filmography

Television

Films

Short films

Public sponsoring 

 2009–2010 Image and face of Gino Lozano hair saloons
 2010 Image of Givenchy

References

External links 

 Esmeralda Mitre twitter page
 Alternativa teatral

1982 births
Living people
21st-century Argentine actresses
Argentine film actresses
Argentine television actresses
Participants in Argentine reality television series
Bailando por un Sueño (Argentine TV series) participants